The 1955 Illinois Fighting Illini football team was an American football team that represented the University of Illinois during the 1955 Big Ten Conference football season. In their 14th year under head coach Ray Eliot, the Illini compiled a 5–3–1 record and finished in fifth place in the Big Ten Conference. Quarterback Em Lindbeck was selected as the team's most valuable player.

Schedule

References

Illinois
Illinois Fighting Illini football seasons
Illinois Fighting Illini football